Kosmos 308 ( meaning Cosmos 308), also known as DS-P1-I No.7 was a satellite which was used as a radar target for anti-ballistic missile tests. It was launched by the Soviet Union in 1969 as part of the Dnepropetrovsk Sputnik programme.

Launch 
It was launched aboard a Kosmos-2I 63SM rocket, from Site 133/1 at Plesetsk. The launch occurred at 11:59:59 UTC on 4 November 1969.

It decayed from orbit on 4 January 1970.

Kosmos 308 was the sixth of nineteen DS-P1-I satellites to be launched. Of these, all reached orbit successfully except the seventh.

See also

 1969 in spaceflight

References

Spacecraft launched in 1969
Kosmos 0308
1969 in the Soviet Union
Dnepropetrovsk Sputnik program